San Domenico is a renaissance-style, former Roman Catholic church located in the town of Oria, province of Brindisi, Apulia, Italy.

History
Dominican friars had been in Oria since the 13th century. This church and convent was erected in 1572 by the Dominican order. The church was restored in 1765-1775 by Saverio Amodio, but by 1806, the convent had been suppressed and the monks expelled. The church remained consecrated but was again refurbished in 1897, this time with a Neoclassical façade. Above the portal is the symbol of the book and cane of the Dominicans

In the Chapel of the Presentation at the Temple on the right is a polychrome stone altar (1670) with an altarpiece (1701) by G. Zullo. The Chapel of St Anne has a Birth of the Virgin altarpiece, while the Chapel of the Holy Sacrament has a Last Supper, both 17th-century works by unknown authors. The transept has two altars (circa 1718) attributed to Giuseppe Cino. These have altarpieces depicting San Domenico by Papagiorgio, and a Madonna of the Rosary. The Apse has paintings depicting the Annunciation, Pentecost, and the Heavenly Assumption of Mary

in the Chapel of the Sacred heard there is a 17th-century Washing of Feet. The Chapel of St Vincent Ferrer houses a painting of the saint (1734) by D. Bianchi.

References

Churches in the province of Brindisi
16th-century Roman Catholic church buildings in Italy
Roman Catholic churches completed in 1572